Feary is a surname. Notable people with the surname include:

 Bert Feary (1885–1952), New Zealand rugby league footballer
 Frederick Feary (1912–1994), American boxer
 John Feary ( 1745–1788), British landscape painter
 Mackey Feary (1955–1999), American musician